Rione Alto is a station on Line 1 of Naples metro, located in the homonymous district. It was opened on 28 May 1993 as part of the inaugural section of Naples Metro, between Vanvitelli and Colli Aminei. The station is located between Montedonzelli and Policlinico. It is part of the circuit of the art stations.

The main entrances are in Via Giulio Palermo, accompanied by a lift in Via Pasquale Del Torto, while further exits are in Via Mariano Semmola, Via Domenico Fontana and Via Antonino D’Antona. An exit also connects it to the nearby Pascale Hospital.

The section of the exit in via Semmola has entered the circuit of the art stations, inside there are installations by Antonio Tammaro and Achille Cevoli outdoors, while inside works by David Tremlet, Giuseppe Zevola, Bianco-Valente, Katharina Sieverding, Marco Anelli and various young artists.

Services 
The station has:

  Automatic ticket office

Interchanges 

  Bus stop

References

See also 

 Art Stations of the Naples Metro

Naples Metro stations
Railway stations opened in 1993
1993 establishments in Italy
Railway stations in Italy opened in the 20th century
Railway stations in Italy opened in the 21st century